Years & Years is the solo project of British singer Olly Alexander. Originally formed as a band in 2010, Years & Years' music has been described as electropop, mixing R&B and 1990s house elements. The band's debut studio album, Communion, debuted at number one on the UK Albums Chart in July 2015 and was the fastest-selling debut album of the year from a UK signed band.

Their biggest hit single "King" from Communion reached number one in the UK Singles Chart in March 2015, and peaked within the top ten of the charts in Australia, Austria, Bulgaria, Denmark, Germany, Luxembourg, the Netherlands, Ireland and Switzerland. Their single "Shine" from the same album reached number two on the UK Singles Chart.

In April 2018, they announced the release of their second studio album Palo Santo which features singles "Sanctify" and "If You're Over Me", the latter of which reached the top 10 in the United Kingdom. The album features a dystopian world consisting of robot-like beings named Androids and humans as the minority, and was released in July 2018.

In March 2021, the band announced a third Years & Years album was in production. The band also announced the same day that Goldsworthy and Türkmen had stepped down as active members, and that the act would continue as Alexander's solo project. The album, Night Call, was released in January 2022, debuting at number one in the UK Albums Chart.

History

2010–2014: Formation and early years 
The band was formed in 2010, after Goldsworthy moved to London from Australia and met Noel Leeman and then later, Türkmen online. Alexander later joined the band as its lead vocalist, after Goldsworthy heard him singing in the shower. The band was originally a five-piece group, with Noel Leeman and Olivier Subria. Years & Years' first single, "I Wish I Knew" was released in July 2012 on the Good Bait label, with the band performing as a five-piece. Leeman and Subria left the band the following year, leaving them as a trio.

In 2013, the group signed a deal to the French label Kitsuné as a three-piece and released their second single, called "Traps" in September 2013. Their third single, called "Real" was released by Kitsuné in February 2014 and its music video featured an appearance by Alexander's Peter and Alice co-star, Ben Whishaw, and the former Misfits actor Nathan Stewart-Jarrett. In 2014, the group signed a deal to Polydor Records and then released their fourth single, called "Take Shelter". The song reached number one on the iTunes UK Singles Electronic Chart. In December 2014, the group released their fifth single, "Desire", which peaked at number 22 on the UK Singles Chart.

2015–2016: Communion 

In January 2015, the band won BBC's Sound of 2015 poll. In the same month, the band's sixth single, "King", was previewed on BBC Radio 1 and selected as Zane Lowe's Hottest Record in the World. "King" was released on 1 March 2015 and reached number one on the UK Singles Chart. Internationally, the single peaked within the top ten of the charts in Australia, Austria, Bulgaria, Denmark, Germany, Luxembourg, the Netherlands, the Republic of Ireland and Switzerland. On 25 February 2015, Years & Years were nominated for the Critics Choice Award at the 2015's BRIT Awards. On 18 March 2015, Years & Years announced their debut studio album, Communion on their Instagram profile. It was released on 10 July 2015, by Polydor Records, debuting at number one on the UK Albums Chart. As well as it being the fastest-selling debut album in 2015 from a UK signed band, it was also the first number one on the inaugural New Music Fridays release date, marking a moment in history.

To celebrate the launch of the album, a world first interactive ad-break takeover happened on Channel 4, on the evening the album was released. Three exclusive music videos for the band's next single, "Shine", were filmed especially for the initiative, and fans were encouraged to 'take control' of the ad break by tweeting the hashtag for the video they most wanted to see; #ChooseLight, #ChooseShadow or #ChooseDark. The initiative garnered 1.55 million viewers and resulted in the most interacted-with ad in Channel 4 history. "Shine" was released as the band's seventh single, serving as a follow-up to their sixth single, "King". It was released on 5 July 2015, peaking at number 2 on the UK Singles Chart. "Eyes Shut" was released as their eighth single that was to be taken from Communion. The music video for the single was released on 27 September 2015, and the video depicted the band exploring a post-apocalyptic world, set in the outskirts of Sofia, Bulgaria.

In January 2016, Years & Years were nominated for four Brit Awards, including British Group, British Breakthrough Act, British Single (for "King") and British Artist Video (also for "King"). On 2 March 2016, the band announced that Tove Lo would feature on their next single; a new version of, "Desire". The music video was released on the next day, accompanied by an open letter from frontman Olly Alexander on the band's Facebook page. This detailed the concept of the video and highlighted the LGBT issues addressed by it (such as sexuality and gender dynamics), for which Alexander had become something of a spokesperson. The band played their biggest headline show to date on 8 April 2016, at Wembley Arena, London, as part of their 2016 UK headline tour. The show was completely sold out, with support coming from MØ, Nimmo and Mabel. In July 2016, the band released the music video for their next single from Communion, "Worship". The music video was directed by Matt Lambert, with choreography from Ryan Heffington. On 11 September 2016, Years & Years performed the last show of their Communion tour at Lollapalooza in Berlin.

2016–2019: Palo Santo 

On 13 September 2016, the band released the song "Meteorite", which was included on the soundtrack for the film Bridget Jones's Baby. On 28 September 2016, the music video for the song was released.

Alexander later announced that he had been working on new music with Julia Michaels and Justin Tranter. The first single from the album, "Sanctify", was released on 7 March 2018. The song became the number 1 trending video on YouTube within the first 24 hours after its launch. A short interview was released after the music video with Alexander explaining his inspiration for the song came from experiences he had with men who claim to be heterosexual but have desires of other sexualities in which they struggle to embrace.

The second single of the album, called "If You're Over Me", was released on 10 May 2018 with its music video released on 14 May 2018. The single peaked at number 6 in the United Kingdom.

On 18 June 2018, the band announced the European dates to their Palo Santo Tour.

The album's title track, "Palo Santo", was released on 22 June 2018 and "All for You" was released on 27 June 2018, with the album subsequently being released on 6 July 2018. The album received acclaim from critics and reached number 3 on the UK Albums Chart. On 17 September 2018, the music video for "All for You" was released, featuring an angelic Alexander dancing within an abandoned warehouse before transforming into a demonic version of himself and engaging in a dance off with an android.

The band was featured on The Greatest Showman: Reimagined covering "Come Alive" alongside Jess Glynne which was released on 16 November 2018.

In November 2018, "Play", a collaboration with DJ Jax Jones was released. It peaked at number 8 on the UK Official Chart. On 28 January the music video released, this was a supermarket belt which Alexander and Jones danced upon with previous signature Jones brands appearing as supermarket items.

On 14 February 2019, a collaboration with MNEK titled "Valentino" was released.

On 4 March 2019, the band announced that Emre would be taking a hiatus from the band whilst they were touring in Asia. His wife delivered a healthy baby girl called Daphne Türkmen. The group performed at the Glastonbury Festival where Alexander gave a speech that was universally praised by fans and media.

On 11 September 2019, they released a single in collaboration with the Pet Shop Boys called "Dreamland", with Alexander appearing alongside the Pet Shop Boys to perform the song during their headlining slot at Radio 2 Live in Hyde Park. Written in 2017, the track was originally scheduled to be released on the Palo Santo album in 2018 but was ultimately included on the Pet Shop Boys' 2020 album Hotspot.

2021–present: Formation change and Night Call 
In conjunction with Alexander starring in the 2021 drama series It's a Sin, Years & Years released a cover of the song of the same name, also by the Pet Shop Boys.

On 18 March 2021, the band announced through an Instagram post that their upcoming album would essentially be a solo project by Alexander, to be released under the band name. Mikey will still play live as an instrumentalist and Emre will focus on his work as a writer and producer. Alexander told Capital FM: "[T]he honest truth of what happened [is that] me, Mikey and Emre met, like, ten years ago. We've been in this band for a decade, and in that time, we've just kind of grown apart musically, right. We kind of stopped making music together, and when we announced that I was going to be Olly Years & Years, it had kind of been a long time coming, if that makes sense. We all got into a new way of living our lives and working together quite separately. Then after the pandemic, I feel like we had all this time to really reflect on what was going on and it made sense that we kind of went our separate ways. I've been writing all the songs for this new album, and Emre's working on other stuff, he's got his family to raise and so it's just an honest thing. We didn't fall out – we're all mates and stuff – so it's definitely different but I'm really excited as well to kind of do my thing this time."

Regarding his decision to keep the "Years & Years" name, Alexander later explained: "I just didn't want to let Years & Years go. I put so much into it. It was a tricky decision in some ways, because I think, possibly, it might have been a bit simpler for everyone if I had just been like, 'Oh, I'm a solo artist now.' But I just didn't want to. Bands are like marriages. Any separation is difficult, and I think it went as well as it could, with us."

On 23 March 2021, "Starstruck" was announced to be the lead single from Years & Years' upcoming third studio album. The song was released on 8 April 2021 and is Years & Years' first release as a solo project. A remix featuring Australian singer Kylie Minogue was released on 21 May 2021.

On 23 September 2021, Years & Years announced the second single, "Crave". The song was released on 28 September 2021 alongside the announcement of his third studio album Night Call. The album was released on 21 January 2022.

On 6 October 2021, "A Second to Midnight" was released, a song by Kylie Minogue and Years & Years that appears on the reissue of Minogue's Disco album.

In November, Years & Years collaborated with Galantis on the single "Sweet Talker". The BBC announced that Years & Years would headline a New Year's Eve concert special, The Big New Years & Years Eve Party, with guest appearances by Minogue and Pet Shop Boys.

On 15 February 2022, Years & Years released a remix of "Starstruck" featuring J-pop singer SIRUP.

On 1 November 2022, Years & Years released a cover of Crystal Waters' 1994 single "100% Pure Love". American retailer Target would use this version for its 2022 holiday campaign.

Influences 
The band's influences include Christina Aguilera, Radiohead, Britney Spears, Kylie Minogue, Janet Jackson, Flying Lotus, Marilyn Manson, the Beatles, Jai Paul, Timbaland, Joni Mitchell, Aaliyah, Justin Timberlake, Rihanna, Robyn, Scritti Politti, Sigur Rós and Pet Shop Boys, with whom the group has collaborated with on the Years & Years version of "It's a Sin" and the 2019 PSB single "Dreamland".

During their concerts, the band have performed covers of songs by Blu Cantrell, Katy Perry, Britney Spears, Pet Shop Boys, Ariana Grande, Madonna, Cyndi Lauper, Joni Mitchell, Brandy and Drake.

Band members

Current members 
 Olly Alexander – vocals, keyboards, synthesisers, piano 

Touring members
 Mikey Goldsworthy – synthesisers, keyboards, bass guitar 
 Paris Jeffree – drums 
 Joell Fender – backing vocals 
 Yasmin Green – backing vocals 
 Tehillah Daniel – backing vocals

Former core members 
 Emre Türkmen – synthesisers, keyboards, beats, samples, sampling, sequencers, laptop, guitar 
 Noel Leeman – synthesisers, keyboards 
 Olivier Subria – drums 

Former touring members
 Dylan Bell – drums 
 Phebe Edwards – backing vocals

Discography 

 Communion (2015)
 Palo Santo (2018)
 Night Call (2022)

Tours 
 Communion Tour (2015–2016)
 Palo Santo Tour (2018–2019)
 Night Call Tour (2022)

Awards and nominations

Projects by former band members

Exit Kid
In 2017, Emre Türkmen formed grunge duo Exit Kid with touring drummer Dylan Bell with the duo releasing a number of EPs while Türkmen continued to be a member of Years & Years. In 2020, Exit Kid released the single "You Got All The World" featuring Türkmen's wife on vocals, with the songs "Out Of Time" and "Sura" being released in 2022.

References

External links 
 
 

Musical groups established in 2010
2010 establishments in the United Kingdom
English electronic music groups
English house music groups
Polydor Records artists
Interscope Records artists
Musical groups from London
Kitsuné artists
LGBT-themed musical groups
British indie pop groups